This is a list of numbered county roads in Haliburton County, Ontario.

Haliburton
Transport in Haliburton County